Events in the year 2022 in the Marshall Islands.

Incumbents 

 President: David Kabua
 Speaker of the house: Kenneth Kedi

Events 
Ongoing – COVID-19 pandemic in the Marshall Islands

 9 August - The first community transmission cases of COVID-19 is reported in the capital Majuro. The government subsequently announces that the start of the school year will be delayed, and also suspends flights and boat travel to the country's outer islands.
 11 August - The first COVID-19 related death is reported in a patient in Majuro.

Deaths

See also 

 COVID-19 pandemic in the Marshall Islands
 2020 in Oceania
 2019–20 South Pacific cyclone season
 2020–21 South Pacific cyclone season

References 

 
2020s in the Marshall Islands
Years of the 21st century in the Marshall Islands
Marshall Islands
Marshall Islands